The 2008–09 Oakland Golden Grizzlies men's basketball team was a National Collegiate Athletic Association Division I college basketball team representing Oakland University.

Oakland was picked to finish third in The Summit League's preseason poll.  was voted to finish first and North Dakota State second.  However, only eight votes separated the three teams.  Senior forward Derick Nelson and junior guard Johnathon Jones were named to the Preseason All-League First Team.  Senior guard Erik Kangas was named to the Second Team.

Prior to the first game of the year against Cleveland State, senior forward Derick Nelson suffered a foot injury and sat out most of the season.  Nelson played in two games against Eastern Michigan and Michigan State, but did not record a point and took a medical redshirt.  Oakland lost their first game against CSU and defeated Pacific-10 Conference opponent Oregon for the second year in a row.

Roster

* Redshirting 2008–2009 season

Awards
 Keith Benson
 Summit League Player of the Week
 Week 12 – Averaged 15.5 points, 12.5 rebounds, 5.5 blocks, 2.5 assists and 1.5 steals per game and shot 82.4 percent (14–17) for the week.
 Johnathon Jones
 Summit League Player of the Week (2)
 Week 2 – Averaged 23.0 points, 5.0 rebounds, 3.7 assists and 1.7 steals against Oregon, Syracuse and Iowa.
 Week 13 – Averaging 15.0 points and 12.5 assists per game against Oral Roberts and Centenary.
 Erik Kangas
 Summit League Player of the Week (2)
 Week 10 – Career-high 39-point game that included 8–13 shooting from three-point range in victory at IPFW.
 Week 11 – Averaged 30.0 points and 7.5 three-pointers per game.  Kangas shot 65% from three-point range.  Kangas was the first player to earn back-to-back player of the week awards since the 2004–2005 season.

Milestones
 Erik Kangas set the Oakland record for career three-pointers made
 Keith Benson set the Oakland record for single-game blocks with eight
 Keith Benson set the Oakland record for single-season blocks

Schedule

References

Oakland Golden Grizzlies
Oakland Golden Grizzlies men's basketball seasons
Oakland
Oakland Golden Grizzlies men's b
Oakland Golden Grizzlies men's b